Second Chance is a 1972 American TV film. Danny Thomas was executive producer.

Cast
Brian Keith
Elizabeth Ashley
Kenneth Mars

References

External links
Second Chance at IMDb
Second Chance at Letterbox DVD

1972 television films
1972 films
American television films
Films directed by Peter Tewksbury